Lene is a feminine given name common in Denmark and Norway.

People called Lene
Lene Alexandra, Norwegian singer
Lene Demsitz, Danish long jumper
Lene Elise Bergum, Norwegian actress
Lene Brøndum, Danish actress
Lene Espersen, Danish politician
Lene Hall, Barbadian model
Lene Hau, Danish physicist
Lene Kaaberbøl, Danish writer
Lene Køppen, Danish badminton player
Lene Lovich, Serbian-American singer
Lene Løseth, Norwegian alpine skier
Lene Marlin, Norwegian singer
Lene Mørk (born 1979), Danish badminton player
Lene Nystrøm Rasted, Norwegian singer with pop group Aqua
Lene Thiesen, Danish theatrist
Lene Moyell Johansen, High commissioner of the Faroe Islands

Other uses
Lene Marie, a ketch-rigged tall ship built in Denmark in 1910

Danish feminine given names
Norwegian feminine given names